Jerry C. Grote (born December 28, 1940) is an American retired basketball player.  He played one season for the Los Angeles Lakers of the National Basketball Association (NBA).

College career
Grote, a 6'4 guard from Cantwell High School in Montebello, California, played collegiately at Loyola University in Los Angeles (now Loyola Marymount).  Grote made a splash in his first year of eligibility, averaging 14.2 points and 6.7 rebounds per game and winning West Coast Athletic Conference player of the year honors as a sophomore.  He followed that up by averaging 12.6 points and 4.9 rebounds and leading the Lions to the 1961 WCAC title.  In Grote's senior year, he averaged 13 points per game and was named second team All-WCAC.  He finished his career with 1,011 points – scoring his 1,000th point in his final collegiate game.

Professional career
Following the close of his college career, Grote was drafted in the fourth round (28th pick overall) of the 1962 NBA draft by the St. Louis Hawks.  However, he opted to play for the Long Beach Chiefs of the American Basketball League.  Grote averaged 7.5 points per game in 24 contests for the Chiefs in the 1962–63 season.

In the 1964–65 NBA season, Grote played for the Los Angeles Lakers.  He appeared in 11 games and scored 14 total points.

References

External links
 

1940 births
Living people
American men's basketball players
Basketball players from California
Guards (basketball)
Long Beach Chiefs players
Los Angeles Lakers players
Loyola Marymount Lions men's basketball players
St. Louis Hawks draft picks
Sportspeople from Montebello, California